"All You Want" is a song by English singer-songwriter Dido, released as the fourth and final single from her debut album, No Angel (1999). The single was released as an exclusive 3-inch mini-disc in the UK, making it ineligible to chart. The track was used at the end of the penultimate episode of the first series of Sky One's Mile High.

Track listings
UK limited-edition mini-CD single
 "All You Want" (radio edit) – 4:03
 "All You Want" (Divide & Rule Remix) – 7:17
 "All You Want" (live) – 4:13
 "Christmas Day" – 4:03

Credits and personnel
Credits are lifted from the UK mini-CD single liner notes and the No Angel album booklet.

Studio
 Mastered at Sterling Sound (New York City)

Personnel
 Dido – writing (as Dido Armstrong), all vocals
 Paulie Herman – writing
 Rollo Armstrong – writing
 Rick Nowels – acoustic guitar, keyboards, Wurlitzer, Chamberlin, production
 Rusty Anderson – electric guitar
 John Themis – electric guitar, percussion
 John Pierce – bass
 Richie Stevens – additional live drums and percussion
 James Sanger – programming
 Ash Howes – recording, mixing
 Randy Wine – US recording engineer
 Tom Coyne – mastering

References

1999 songs
2001 singles
Bertelsmann Music Group singles
Cheeky Records singles
Dido (singer) songs
Song recordings produced by Dido (singer)
Song recordings produced by Rick Nowels
Songs written by Dido (singer)
Songs written by Rollo Armstrong